Myron Maynard Guyton (born August 26, 1967) is a former American football player.  He played professionally as a defensive back in the National Football League (NFL) for the New York Giants (1989–1993) and the New England Patriots (1994–1995). He was a member of the Giants team that won Super Bowl XXV. Before his NFL career, he played college football at Eastern Kentucky University and was selected by the Giants in the eighth round of the 1989 NFL Draft.  Guyton is a member of Phi Beta Sigma fraternity, Iota Delta chapter of Eastern Kentucky University.

On April 16, 2012, Guyton was among four former NFL players filing a lawsuit claiming the league did not properly protect players from concussions.

References

1967 births
Living people
American football safeties
Eastern Kentucky Colonels football players
New England Patriots players
New York Giants players
People from Thomas County, Georgia
Players of American football from Georgia (U.S. state)
African-American players of American football
21st-century African-American people
20th-century African-American sportspeople